The Battle of the Great Foss occurred in 682 BC during the Second Messenian War (685–668 BC). The word "foss" derives from the Latin fossa, meaning "ditch" or "trench." According to Pausanias the outcome of the battle was determined by trickery. The Spartans bribed Aristocrates of Orchomenus, the king of the Arcadians, to withdraw his men just as the battle was beginning. This resulted in the slaughter of the Messenians. Aristocrates was later stoned to death by the Arcadians for this treachery.

References and further reading

Sources
 Montagu, John Drogo. Battles of the Greek and Roman Worlds: A Chronological Compendium of 667 Battles to 318BC.  Mechanicsburg, PA: Greenhill Books, 2000.

Great Foss
Messenian Wars
682 BC
Great Foss